Geotrupes opacus, the opaque earth boring beetle, is a species of earth-boring scarab beetle in the family Geotrupidae.

References

Further reading

 

Geotrupidae
Articles created by Qbugbot
Beetles described in 1853